Sandi Metz is an American software engineer and author. She is the author of Practical Object-Oriented Design in Ruby.  Metz teaches workshops around the country for new and experienced developers, emphasizing good programming habits and practices.

Metz is known for her books and articles on object-oriented programming and her statement regarding the Don't repeat yourself principle, that duplication is cheaper than the wrong abstraction.

Publications
 Metz, Sandi (September 5, 2012), Practical Object-Oriented Design in Ruby (First ed.), Addison-Wesley, 
 Metz, Sandi & Owen, Katrina (Mar 20, 2017), 99 Bottles of OOP (First ed.), Potato Canyon Software, LLC,

Important concepts elaborated
 SOLID Design principles
 Test-driven development
 Dependency injection

References

External links
 
 RubyConf 2017 Keynote Speech
 Ruby Rogues Interview

Living people
American software engineers
Year of birth missing (living people)